Austin Rashad Walter (born August 17, 1996) is an American football running back for the Las Vegas Raiders of the National Football League (NFL). He played college football at Rice.

College career 
Walter played college football at Rice, where he rushed for 1,744 yards and 13 touchdowns, averaging 5.1 yards per carry; he also had 79 receptions for 803 yards, and in his senior season, averaged 27.3 yards on 18 kickoff returns.

Professional career

San Francisco 49ers
Walter went undrafted in the 2019 NFL Draft. He signed with the San Francisco 49ers on May 4, 2019 after a tryout with the team. He was waived by the 49ers on August 31, 2019.

New York Giants
On September 18, 2019, Walter was signed to the New York Giants practice squad. Following injuries to starting running back Saquon Barkley and backup Wayne Gallman, Walter was promoted to the 53-man roster on October 10, 2019, but then waived the next day.

Dallas Renegades
On November 22, 2019, Walter was drafted by the Dallas Renegades in the 2020 XFL Supplemental Draft. He had his contract terminated when the league suspended operations on April 10, 2020.

San Francisco 49ers (second stint)
On September 23, 2020, Walter was signed to the San Francisco 49ers' practice squad. He was elevated to the active roster on November 5 for the team's week 9 game against the Green Bay Packers, and reverted to the practice squad after the game. He was promoted to the active roster on November 11, 2020. He was placed on the reserve/COVID-19 list by the team on December 17, 2020, and activated on December 28. On February 8, 2021, the 49ers signed him to a one-year contract extension. He was waived on May 12, 2021.

New York Jets
Walter was claimed off waivers by the New York Jets on May 13, 2021. He was waived/injured on August 17, 2021 and placed on injured reserve. He was released on August 26. Walter was re-signed to the practice squad on October 5, 2021.  Walter played his first game for the Jets against the Houston Texans on November 28, 2021 and rushed for 38 yards on 9 carries, including his first NFL touchdown. On December 4, 2021, Walter was elevated from the practice squad for the game against the Philadelphia Eagles. On December 7, 2021, Walter was promoted to the active roster. He was waived on May 6, 2022.

Las Vegas Raiders
On July 29, 2022, Walter signed with the Las Vegas Raiders. A few days later, in the 2022 Pro Football Hall of Fame game, Walter scored a touchdown against the Jacksonville Jaguars. On August 30, 2022, Walter was waived by the Raiders and then signed to the practice squad the next day. He signed a reserve/future contract on January 9, 2023.

References

1996 births
Living people
American football running backs
Rice Owls football players
San Francisco 49ers players
New York Giants players
People from Crosby, Texas
Players of American football from Texas
Sportspeople from Harris County, Texas
Dallas Renegades players
New York Jets players
Las Vegas Raiders players